Daruka is an outer suburb of Tamworth, New South Wales, in the city's north. It is located in the Daruka Valley north of the suburb North Tamworth and east of the locality of Moore Creek and is bounded in the north by the stream Moore Creek. To the east of Daruka is Moonbi and Kootingal. The neighbourhood of Upper Moore Creek  is within the north of the locality.

Locality
Daruka Estate starts on Daruka Road to the west and ends at the end of Tintinhull Road to the east. Daruka Estate is mostly a medium to high range socio economic class due to the larger property sizes.

References

Suburbs of Tamworth, New South Wales